Vincent Young may refer to:

 Vince Young (born 1983), American football quarterback
 Vincent Young (actor) (born 1964), American actor